Continental Philosophy: A Critical Approach is a 2005 book by William R. Schroeder in which the author provides an "introduction to the key figures and philosophical movements of the nineteenth and twentieth centuries".

Reception
The books is reviewed by Richard Schacht (University of Illinois), Frithjof Bergmann (University of Michigan), Todd May (Clemson University), Marie Ramoya (Ateneo de Manila University) and Jeffrey M. Jackson.

References

External links 
 Continental Philosophy: A Critical Approach

2005 non-fiction books
Continental philosophy literature
Books about Friedrich Nietzsche
Wiley (publisher) books